The 2013 Malaysian general election protest or Himpunan Black Out 2013 (Malay) was a series of rallies held throughout Malaysia after the 2013 general election to express discontent with the election result. The first rally was in Kelana Jaya, Malaysia on 8 May 2013. The rally was held by various Malaysian opposition-friendly non-governmental organisations and opposition parties claiming that there had been irregularities in the polling. The main venue chosen for the rally was Kelana Jaya Stadium. Web sites and blogs favourable to the opposition claimed that the rally was attended by 120,000 people. Noting that the stadium's normal capacity is about 25,000, other sources estimated the number of people in and around it to be between 64,000 and 69,000.

List of nationwide "Himpunan Black Out" rallies
1st Rally – Kelana Jaya, 8 May 2013
2nd Rally – Batu Kawan, 11 May 2013
3rd Rally – Ipoh, 12 May 2013
4th Rally – Kuantan, 14 May 2013
5th Rally – Johor Bahru, 15 May 2013
6th Rally – Seremban, 17 May 2013
7th Rally – Alor Setar, 21 May 2013
8th Rally – Kuala Terengganu, 23 May 2013
9th Rally – Bukit Katil, 24 May 2013
10th Rally – Himpunan Kemuncak Blackout 505 (Petaling Jaya, 25 May 2013)
11th Rally – Kangar, 10 June 2013
12th Rally – Sungai Petani, 11 June 2013
13th Rally – Kota Bharu, 11 June 2013
14th Rally – Batu Pahat, 16 June 2013
15th Rally – Kuala Lumpur (Taman Merbok), 22 June 2013

Accusing the Election Commission of fraudulent conduct
The rally was initiated by Anwar Ibrahim, who claimed that the election was fraudulent. The opposition won 3 states (Selangor, Kelantan and Penang), but Barisan Nasional won the elections despite losing the popular vote, thereby gaining the mandate to lead Malaysia for another 5 years. In the rally Anwar Ibrahim urged opposition supporters to wear black as a sign of protest.

Issues raised
Anwar Ibrahim and other Democratic Action Party (DAP) leaders present at the rally raised issues such as phantom voters, blackouts and the usage of indelible ink by the Malaysian Election Commission.

See also
 List of protests in the 21st century

References

Protests in Malaysia
Protest marches
Civil rights protests
2013 in Malaysia
2013 protests
2010s in Kuala Lumpur
Protests against results of elections